Distinctness of image (DOI) is a quantification of the deviation of the direction of light propagation from the regular direction by scattering during transmission or reflection. DOI is sensitive to even subtle scattering effects; the more light is being scattered out of the regular direction the more the initially sharp (well defined) image is blurred (that is, small details are lost). In polluted air it is the sum of all particles of various dimensions (dust, aerosols, vapor, etc.) that induces haze.

DOI is measured to characterize the visual appearance of polished high-gloss surfaces such as automotive car finishes, mirrors, beyond the capabilities of gloss.

Other appearance phenomena are: gloss, haze, and orange peel.

Reflected Image Quality (RIQ) vs. DOI

DOI is not sensitive to low amounts of orange peel on highest quality surfaces.

RIQ has more proportionate response to orange peel on a wider range of surface finishes.

RIQ works well in differentiating low gloss surfaces with different specular/diffuse components.

Parameters that affect RIQ
 Substrate alignment (horizontal/vertical)
 Coating formulation
 Substrate
 Application technique

References

 ASTM Standards on Color & Appearance Measurement
 Richard S. Hunter, The Measurement of Appearance, John Wiley & Sons (1987)

External links
 Measurement Theory

Vision
Optics